The San Diego Community College District (SDCCD) is a public community college district in San Diego, California. The SDCCD is one of the five community college districts in San Diego County and part of the California Community Colleges system. Under the California Master Plan for Higher Education, the California Community Colleges system is a part of the state's three-tier public higher education system, which also includes the University of California system and California State University system.

The San Diego Community College District consists of three two-year, associate degree-awarding campuses: San Diego City College, San Diego Mesa College, and San Diego Miramar College; and seven San Diego Continuing Education campuses: César Chávez, CE at Mesa College, CE at Miramar College, Educational Cultural Complex (ECC), Mid-City, North City, and West City. San Diego Mesa College also offers a bachelor's degree in health information management. SDCCD is one of the 73 districts containing the 112 public community colleges in the state of California.

The three two-year, associate degree-awarding community colleges are accredited by the Accrediting Commission for Community and Junior Colleges (ACCJC).

Serving more than 102,000 students, it is one of the largest community college districts in the state of California and in the United States. City College became the third community college in the state and Mesa College is one of the largest in the state today.

History

Community college education in San Diego can be traced to 1914 when the Board of Education of the San Diego City Schools authorized postsecondary classes for the youth of San Diego. Classes opened that fall at San Diego High School with four faculty members and 35 students, establishing San Diego City College.

In 1921, City College moved from the high school to share facilities with the State Normal School, the four-year teachers' college which, in 1898, became San Diego State University.  For 25 years, the Junior College program remained at San Diego State University.  During this period, in 1938, the San Diego Vocational Junior College was established to offer training in technical-vocational skills to post high school students.  The following year, the San Diego Evening Junior College was set up to provide college classes in the evening for adults who were unable to attend classes during the day.

In 1946, City College moved back to San Diego High School and reorganized into three branches: San Diego Vocational High School, San Diego College Arts and Sciences, and San Diego Evening Junior College.  City College continued to grow during the 1950s and 60s as land was acquired to allow expansion through various blocks of today's northeast Downtown San Diego.

In 1964, San Diego Mesa College was opened to 1,800 students. Five years later, in 1969, San Diego Miramar College opened on 140 acres in what was then undeveloped land north of the Miramar Naval Air Station, now known as Mira Mesa. Unlike City and Mesa Colleges which offered a wide range of general education classes, Miramar College began by concentrating on law enforcement and fire science training. It has since broadened its curriculum to include the general education college courses needed by students in the rapidly growing northern area of the city, as well as new transfer and vocational programs.

In November 1972, the voters approved separating the San Diego Community College District from the San Diego Unified School District.  The first election of community college district trustees was held in November 1973.

The year 1976 brought the opening of a unique district campus, the Educational Cultural Complex, dedicated to offering both college and continuing education classes to the multicultural population surrounding its Ocean View Boulevard site. In 1979-80 the administration of the Evening College program was merged with those of the day college programs at San Diego City, San Diego Mesa, and San Diego Miramar Colleges.  With both college and Continuing Education programs, as well as extensive educational programs at military bases across the nation, the San Diego Community College District became second-largest community college district in California.

Recent times
All campuses have receive extensive expansion and renovations in the last 20 years:

At City College, Propositions S and N-funded projects for the 60-acre City College have included six new instructional and career training facilities, eight major renovations, and new parking, public safety, and infrastructure projects. Construction for a new Child Development Center is underway with an estimated completion date of Summer 2020. The building consists of new spaces for child care from infant, toddler and pre-K with unique play areas for the different age groups, along with observation rooms for students in the child development program. Recently, a major renovation was completed for the A and T buildings on campus, providing a complete interior transformation of both buildings, new technology, new finishes, extensive new hardscape to create, for the first time in the campus’ history, pathways and gathering areas in between the two previously unconnected buildings.

At Mesa College, Propositions S & N-funded projects for Mesa have included six new academic and career training facilities, two campus support facilities, five major renovation projects, and numerous infrastructure, parking, and public safety projects. Recently, the campus’ new Center for Business Technology (BT) building opened, expanding upon the east campus gateway projects. 

San Diego Continuing Education is made up of seven unique campuses located throughout San Diego. Propositions S & N-funded projects for Continuing Education included the construction of six new campus facilities - Mid-City Campus, North City Campus, West City Campus, Continuing Education Mesa College Campus, Continuing Education Miramar College Campus, César E. Chávez Campus, and the new Skills Center at the Educational Cultural Complex (ECC). An 18,000 square foot wing was added to the ECC as well, creating a permanent home for programs previously housed in bungalows and modular classrooms. The bond program also provided for a complete seismic retrofit for the Centre City Campus. No major construction projects are currently planned for the 2019–20 school year.

Governance
The San Diego Community College District is governed by a five-member, locally elected Board of Trustees and three student members serving on a rotating basis, representing each of the three colleges.  The sitting student trustee has an advisory vote on the Board.  Shared governance activities involve faculty, students and staff in the development of solutions to key policy and budget issues.  The five trustees are elected in even-numbered years to four-year terms by the voters of San Diego.  Trustee candidates first run in district-only elections. The top two vote-getters in each district run citywide in the general election.

Each college of the SDCCD, including Continuing Education, is headed by a president and three vice presidents overseeing instruction, administrative services, and student services, respectively.  Each academic school department is headed by a dean.

Administration
The San Diego Community College District has five major operational components: City College, Mesa College, Miramar College, Continuing Education, and the District administrative departments that support campus and overall operations. The administrative departments include Business Services, Facilities Management, Human Resources, Instructional Services and Student Services.

Functions that are the responsibility of the District administrative departments are intended to provide for efficiency and continuity of services and programs. Compliance and functions that are statutorily required are also the responsibility of various District operations. The provision of educational programs, student support services, staff development, direct campus operations, and various ancillary functions are the responsibility of each College and Continuing Education.

All administrative departments and operations in the District Office are under the final authority of the Chancellor and the College/Continuing Education operations are under the final authority of the President, who reports to the
Chancellor. The Board of Trustees is the final level of authority for all functions within the District.

Board of Trustees
The Board of Trustees is responsible for establishing policies that govern all activities related to conducting the business of the District, the Colleges, and Continuing Education. Development and review of policies and procedures are collegial efforts involving a variety of participatory governance groups. For policies and regulations that affect academic and professional matters, the Board relies primarily on the Academic Senates; on matters defined as within the scope of bargaining interests, the Board follows the requirements of negotiations. For administrative matters, the Board relies primarily on the recommendations of staff with input from various constituencies in the development and review process. The general public may comment at public Board meetings on any policy consideration before the Board.

District Chancellor
The Chancellor is the District's Chief Executive Officer and is responsible for carrying out the policies approved by the Board of Trustees and for providing overall leadership for the District.  The Chancellor maintains a Cabinet composed by the Presidents of the Colleges/Continuing Education, five Vice Chancellors overseeing the District's departments of Business and Technology Services, Student Services, Human Resources and Administrative Services, Facilities Management, and Instructional Services; and the Director of Communications and Public Relations.

College Presidents
The President is the institutional Chief Executive Officer of the College/Continuing Education. The President reports to the Chancellor. The President is responsible for the day-to-day operation of the total College/Continuing Education program and provides leadership and coordination for the College/Continuing Education community. The Presidents and Chancellor provide overall leadership and authority on all of the functional areas.  Each President maintains a Cabinet composed of three Vice Presidents overseeing Instruction, Administrative Services and Student Services and the Dean of each School of each College including the Dean of Student Affairs and the Dean of Student Development and Matriculation.

Campuses

The San Diego Community College District consists of three two-year community colleges and seven Continuing Education campuses. For the 2018–19 school year, all institutions were serving approximately 102,000 students. The three colleges offer associate degrees and certificates in occupational programs that prepare students for entry-level jobs, and arts and sciences programs that transfer to four-year colleges and universities. Mesa College offers a bachelor's degree in health information management. Continuing Education's Educational Cultural Complex (ECC) also offers classes leading to associate degrees and certificates.

The Continuing Education campuses offer adults noncredit vocational, basic skills, life skills, and enrichment classes at sites throughout the city. A number of special programs are unique to the city, including KSDS-FM all-jazz radio, the Center for Competitive and Applied Technologies, and the Workplace Learning Resource Center.

San Diego City College

Located in downtown San Diego as the first community college in the city and the third in California, City College sits on 60 acres and offers over 100 majors to more than 20,000 students. Besides general education, transfer and AA/AS degree programs, some of the disciplines available at City are:

San Diego Mesa College

As one of the largest and most successful of California's 112 community colleges, and as the largest college in the San Diego Community College District, Mesa College opened in 1964 and it now serves over 24,000 students on a campus of 104 acres offering more than 150 programs of instruction. Among its unique programs available on campus are:

San Diego Miramar College

Located on 120 acres in the Mira Mesa/Scripps Ranch suburban area of San Diego along the I-15 corridor, Miramar opened as a training facility for San Diego's law enforcement personnel and firefighters in 1969.

Today, Miramar College offers over 120 certificates, associate degrees, and comprehensive 4-year university transfer programs and is home to the Southern California Biotechnology Center, the Advanced Transportation and Energy Center, and the San Diego Regional Public Safety Institute which provides training for nearly all law enforcement officers and firefighters within San Diego County and also trains EMTs and offers the only open water lifeguard degree in the world. Miramar has the only entry-level biotechnology program in San Diego County.  Miramar boasts unique career training in the following:

San Diego Continuing Education
San Diego Continuing Education was the first and remains the only community college continuing education institution in California to meet the standards for independent accreditation from the Western Association of Schools and Colleges. Continuing Education was also one of the first in California to establish a Joint High School Diploma partnership with the local school district, and was also among the first continuing education programs in California to serve 100,000 students per academic year.

Today, the Continuing Education system consists of seven campuses and 56 partnered locations throughout the city where instruction may be offered in collaboration with schools, community service providers, and other institutions. Instruction offered at Continuing Education includes:

Computer information technology
Career training
Disability support programs
English as a second language (ESL)
GED/high school diploma
Parenting education
U.S. Citizenship preparation

Admissions
The San Diego Community College District conducts open enrollment in all of its three community colleges and seven Continuing Education campuses.

Academics
City College, Mesa College, and Miramar College as public two-year community colleges administered by the San Diego Community College District offer credit programs leading to degrees, transfer, employment, and skills improvement along with the District's Continuing Education division of seven major campuses throughout San Diego.

As required by the voters of San Diego in 1972, the San Diego Community College District is to provide education for all high school graduates and adults 18 years of age and older in the service region. This charge includes providing adult basic education, including GED/High School Diploma, through sophomore-level college degree programs, with both academic and vocational curricula.

San Diego Community Colleges offer over 130 individual disciplines with over 300 academic programs that lead to associate degrees or Certificates of Performance.  Academics are held within individual schools at each college which in turn are divided into separate departments holding their areas of study and instruction.

References

External links
 

California Community Colleges
School districts in San Diego County, California
Universities and colleges in San Diego
Schools accredited by the Western Association of Schools and Colleges
1972 establishments in California
Educational institutions established in 1972